Glycosyltransferase-like protein LARGE2 is an enzyme that in humans is encoded by the GYLTL1B gene.

References

Further reading